John William Strutt, 3rd Baron Rayleigh,  (12 November 1842 – 30 June 1919) was a British mathematician and physicist who made extensive contributions to science. He spent all of his academic career at the University of Cambridge. Among many honours, he received the 1904 Nobel Prize in Physics "for his investigations of the densities of the most important gases and for his discovery of argon in connection with these studies." He served as president of the Royal Society from 1905 to 1908 and as chancellor of the University of Cambridge from 1908 to 1919.

Rayleigh provided the first theoretical treatment of the elastic scattering of light by particles much smaller than the light's wavelength, a phenomenon now known as "Rayleigh scattering", which notably explains why the sky is blue. He studied and described transverse surface waves in solids, now known as "Rayleigh waves". He contributed extensively to fluid dynamics, with concepts such as the Rayleigh number (a dimensionless number associated with natural convection), Rayleigh flow, the Rayleigh–Taylor instability, and Rayleigh's criterion for the stability of Taylor–Couette flow. He also formulated the circulation theory of aerodynamic lift. In optics, Rayleigh proposed a well-known criterion for angular resolution. His derivation of the Rayleigh–Jeans law for classical black-body radiation later played an important role in the birth of quantum mechanics (see Ultraviolet catastrophe). Rayleigh's textbook The Theory of Sound (1877) is still used today by acousticians and engineers.

Biography
Strutt was born on 12 November 1842 at Langford Grove in Maldon, Essex. In his early years he suffered from frailty and poor health. He attended Eton College and Harrow School (each for only a short period), before going on to the University of Cambridge in 1861 where he studied mathematics at Trinity College, Cambridge. He obtained a Bachelor of Arts degree (Senior Wrangler and 1st Smith's Prize) in 1865, and a Master of Arts in 1868. He was subsequently elected to a fellowship of Trinity. He held the post until his marriage to Evelyn Balfour, daughter of James Maitland Balfour, in 1871. He had three sons with her. In 1873, on the death of his father, John Strutt, 2nd Baron Rayleigh, he inherited the Barony of Rayleigh.

He was the second Cavendish Professor of Physics at the University of Cambridge (following James Clerk Maxwell), from 1879 to 1884. He first described dynamic soaring by seabirds in 1883, in the British journal Nature. From 1887 to 1905 he was professor of Natural Philosophy at the Royal Institution.

Around the year 1900 Rayleigh developed the duplex (combination of two) theory of human sound localisation using two binaural cues, interaural phase difference (IPD) and interaural level difference (ILD) (based on analysis of a spherical head with no external pinnae). The theory posits that we use two primary cues for sound lateralisation, using the difference in the phases of sinusoidal components of the sound and the difference in amplitude (level) between the two ears.

In 1904 he was awarded the Nobel Prize for Physics "for his investigations of the densities of the most important gases and for his discovery of argon in connection with these studies".

During the First World War, he was president of the government's Advisory Committee for Aeronautics, which was located at the National Physical Laboratory, and chaired by Richard Glazebrook.

In 1919, Rayleigh served as president of the Society for Psychical Research. As an advocate that simplicity and theory be part of the scientific method, Rayleigh argued for the principle of similitude.

Rayleigh was elected fellow of the Royal Society on 12 June 1873, and served as president of the Royal Society from 1905 to 1908. From time to time he participated in the House of Lords; however, he spoke up only if politics attempted to become involved in science.

Many of the papers that he wrote on lubrication are now recognized as early classical contributions to the field of tribology. For these contributions, he was named as one of the 23 "Men of Tribology" by Duncan Dowson.

He died on 30 June 1919, at his home in Witham, Essex. He was succeeded, as the 4th Lord Rayleigh, by his son Robert John Strutt, another well-known physicist. Lord Rayleigh was buried in the graveyard of All Saints' Church in Terling in Essex. There is a memorial to him by Derwent Wood in St Andrew's Chapel at Westminster Abbey.

Religious views
Rayleigh was an Anglican. Though he did not write about the relationship of science and religion, he retained a personal interest in spiritual matters. When his scientific papers were to be published in a collection by the Cambridge University Press, Strutt wanted to include a quotation from the Bible, but he was discouraged from doing so, as he later reported:

Still, he had his wish and the quotation was printed in the five-volume collection of scientific papers. In a letter to a family member, he wrote about his rejection of materialism and spoke of Jesus Christ as a moral teacher:

He held an interest in parapsychology and was an early member of the Society for Psychical Research (SPR). He was not convinced of spiritualism but remained open to the possibility of supernatural phenomena. Rayleigh was the president of the SPR in 1919. He gave a presidential address in the year of his death but did not come to any definite conclusions.

Honours and awards 

The lunar crater Rayleigh as well as the Martian crater Rayleigh were named in his honour. The asteroid 22740 Rayleigh was named after him on 1 June 2007. A type of surface waves are known as Rayleigh waves. The rayl, a unit of specific acoustic impedance, is also named for him. Rayleigh was also awarded with (in chronological order):
 Smith's Prize (1864)
 Royal Medal (1882)
Member of the American Philosophical Society (1886)
 Matteucci Medal (1894)
 Member of the Royal Swedish Academy of Sciences (1897)
 Copley Medal (1899)
 Nobel Prize in Physics (1904)
 Elliott Cresson Medal (1913)
 Rumford Medal (1914)

Lord Rayleigh was among the original recipients of the Order of Merit (OM) in the 1902 Coronation Honours list published on 26 June 1902, and received the order from King Edward VII at Buckingham Palace on 8 August 1902.

He received the degree of Doctor mathematicae (honoris causa) from the Royal Frederick University on 6 September 1902, when they celebrated the centennial of the birth of mathematician Niels Henrik Abel.

Sir William Ramsay, his co-worker in the investigation to discover argon described Rayleigh as "the greatest man alive" while speaking to Lady Ramsay during his last illness.

H. M. Hyndman said of Rayleigh that "no man ever showed less consciousness of great genius".

Bibliography

 The Theory of Sound vol. I (London : Macmillan, 1877, 1894) (alternative link: Bibliothèque Nationale de France OR (Cambridge: University Press, reissued 2011)
 The Theory of Sound vol.II (London : Macmillan, 1878, 1896) (alternative link: Bibliothèque Nationale de France) OR (Cambridge: University Press, reissued 2011)
 Scientific papers (Vol. 1: 1869–1881) (Cambridge : University Press, 1899–1920, reissued by the publisher 2011)
 Scientific papers (Vol. 2: 1881–1887) (Cambridge : University Press, 1899–1920, reissued by the publisher 2011)
 Scientific papers (Vol. 3: 1887–1892) (Cambridge : University Press, 1899–1920, reissued by the publisher 2011)
 Scientific papers (Vol. 4: 1892–1901) (Cambridge : University Press, 1899–1920, reissued by the publisher 2011)
 Scientific papers (Vol. 5: 1902–1910) (Cambridge : University Press, 1899–1920, reissued by the publisher 2011)
 Scientific papers (Vol. 6: 1911–1919) (Cambridge : University Press, 1899–1920, reissued by the publisher 2011)

See also

References

External links

About John William Strutt

Lord Rayleigh – the Last of the Great Victorian Polymaths, GEC Review, Volume 7, No. 3, 1992

1842 births
1919 deaths
20th-century British physicists
Acousticians
Alumni of Trinity College, Cambridge
Barons in the Peerage of the United Kingdom
British Nobel laureates
Chancellors of the University of Cambridge
De Morgan Medallists
Discoverers of chemical elements
English Anglicans
Experimental physicists
Faraday Lecturers
Optical physicists
Fluid dynamicists
Lord-Lieutenants of Essex
Members of the Order of Merit
Nobel laureates in Physics
Eldest sons of British hereditary barons
Fellows of the Royal Society
Fellows of the American Academy of Arts and Sciences
Foreign associates of the National Academy of Sciences
Members of the Royal Swedish Academy of Sciences
Members of the Royal Netherlands Academy of Arts and Sciences
Members of the Bavarian Academy of Sciences
Members of the Prussian Academy of Sciences
Members of the Hungarian Academy of Sciences
Members of the French Academy of Sciences
Parapsychologists
People educated at Eton College
People educated at Harrow School
People from Maldon, Essex
Presidents of the Physical Society
Presidents of the Royal Society
Recipients of the Copley Medal
Recipients of the Pour le Mérite (civil class)
Royal Medal winners
Senior Wranglers
John
Members of the Privy Council of the United Kingdom
Burials in Essex
Linear algebraists
Tribologists
Recipients of the Matteucci Medal
Members of the American Philosophical Society
Cavendish Professors of Physics
Members of the Royal Society of Sciences in Uppsala